"Break My Heart" is a song by American rock band Hey Violet from their debut studio album, From the Outside (2017). The song was written by the band's members, along with the song's producers Julian Bunetta, Cory Enemy, and the Picard Brothers. It was released on March 10, 2017, as the album's second single.

Composition
"Break My Heart" is a part of the sonic departure from the pop punk style Hey Violet previously created to a more synth-based sound. Lead singer Rena Lovelis described the single as a song that is "capable of experimenting with new sounds and toying with synths."

Critical reception
Alternative Press called the song a "jam", while Popdust dubbed it as "a full-blown addiction". Mike Wass from Idolator described the song as a "monstrous electro-anthem". In a review of From the Outside, Heather Phares noted that the song "takes its cues from late-2010s trends like tropical pop and EDM, but the hooks are all Hey Violet".

Music video
The music video for "Break My Heart", directed by Darren Craig and Jesse Heath, premiered on April 3, 2017.

Track listings
Digital download
"Break My Heart" – 3:29

Digital download – Stripped
"Break My Heart" (Stripped) – 3:49

Digital download – Vertue Remix
"Break My Heart" (Vertue Remix) – 4:07

Digital download – Big Fish Remix
"Break My Heart" (Big Fish Remix) – 3:35

Charts

Release history

References

2017 singles
2017 songs
Capitol Records singles
Songs written by Julian Bunetta
Songs written by Kristian Lundin